Harpachne is a genus of Asian and African plants in the grass family.

 Species
 Harpachne bogdanii Kenn.-O'Byrne – Kenya
 Harpachne harpachnoides (Hack.) B.S.Sun & S.Wang – China (Sichuan, Yunnan)
 Harpachne schimperi A.Rich. – Yemen, Saudi Arabia, Ethiopia, Eritrea, Somalia, Sudan, South Sudan, Kenya, Uganda, Rwanda, Burundi, Tanzania, Republic of the Congo, Zambia, Zimbabwe

References

Poaceae genera
Chloridoideae